This is the discography of Canadian singer-songwriter Corey Hart.

Albums

Studio albums

Compilation albums

Singles

Videos

Video albums

Music videos

Notes

References

Discographies of Canadian artists
Pop music discographies
Rock music discographies
New wave discographies